Kembangan is a district in West Jakarta, Indonesia. Kembangan is bounded by Pesanggrahan Subdistrict (South Jakarta) to the south, Tangerang Regency to the south and west, Cengkareng Subdistrict (West Jakarta) to the north, and Kebon Jeruk Subdistrict (West Jakarta) to the east. The City Hall of West Jakarta is located in this district.

Kelurahan (Administrative Villages)
The district of Kembangan is divided into six kelurahan or administrative villages :
 Kembangan Utara - area code 11610 
 Kembangan Selatan - area code 11610 
 Meruya Utara - area code 11620 
Meruya Selatan - area code 11650 
 Srengseng - area code 11630 
 Joglo - area code 11640

Notable places

Puri Indah: Puri Indah area is 180 hectares is a CBD area that will consist of five star hotels, apartments, suites office towers, convention & exhibition center, international hospital and luxury shopping malls. It is developed and maintained by Pondok Indah Group.
St. Moritz: St. Moritz Apartment & Residences is a Super-block project by Lippo Group located in the business center of Puri Indah.

 West Jakarta City Hall
 Puri Indah Mall
 PX Pavilion @ St. Moritz
 Lippo Mall Puri
 Carrefour Puri Indah
 Hypermart Puri Indah
 Pondok Indah Hospital Puri Indah
 Puri Indah Market
 Srengseng City Forest
 Sekolah Menengah Negeri Atas Negeri 85
 Notre Dame school
 Ipeka Puri school
 Springfield School
 Mercu Buana University
 Lotte Mart

Housing Estates 
 Komplek Migas 41 Srengseng
 Puri Indah
 Puri Kencana
 Puri Mansion
 Taman Permata Buana
 Taman Meruya Ilir
 Kavling DKI Meruya
 Taman Villa Meruya (Anwa Residence Puri)
 Taman Aries
 Permata Puri Media
 St. Moritz Penthouses & Residences

Toll Road Access

West Jakarta
Districts of Jakarta
Central business districts in Indonesia
Shopping districts and streets in Indonesia